

Court of Appeal of Jersey 

Members of the Court of Appeal are appointed under the Court of Appeal (Jersey) Law 1961. The Court of Appeal sits for seven to eight weeks during the year.

Current members of the Court of Appeal of Jersey

Former members of the Court of Appeal of Jersey

 Sir Godfray Le Quesne QC (1964–97)
 Lord Ackner (1967–71), subsequently a judge of the High Court and Court of Appeal in England and Wales and a Lord of Appeal in Ordinary
 Lord Jauncy of Tullichettle (1972–79), subsequently a member of the judiciary in Scotland and a Lord of Appeal in Ordinary
 Rt Hon Sir Roger Parker (1974–77), subsequently a judge of the High Court and Court of Appeal of England and Wales
 Lord Browne Wilkinson (1976–77)
 Rt Hon Sir Martin Nourse (1977–80), subsequently a judge of the High Court and Court of Appeal
 Lord Neill of Bladon QC (1977–94)
 Lord Clyde (1979–85), subsequently a member of the judiciary in Scotland and a Lord of Appeal in Ordinary
 His Honour Henry Pownall (1980–84), subsequently a Permanent Judge at the Central Criminal Court in England
 Lord Hoffmann (1980–1985), subsequently a judge of the High Court and Court of Appeal in England and a Lord of Appeal in Ordinary
 Lord Alexander of Weedon QC
 Sir David Calcutt QC
 Rt Hon Sir John Chadwick (1986–93), subsequently a judge of the High Court and Court of Appeal in England and Wales
 Sir Louis Blom-Cooper QC (1988–96)
 Sir Sydney Kentridge QC (1988–92)
 Rt Hon Lord Hamilton (1988–95), subsequently Lord Justice General in Scotland
 Lord Carlisle of Bucklow QC (1990–99)
 Dame Elizabeth Gloster DBE (1993–2004), subsequently a judge of the High Court of England and Wales
 Richard Southwell QC (1994–2005)
 Lord Clarke (1995–2000), subsequently a member of the judiciary in Scotland
 Sir John Goldring (1998–99), subsequently a judge of the High Court and Senior Presiding Judge in England and Wales
 Sir Michael Tugendhat (2000–03), subsequently a judge of the High Court of England and Wales
 Rt Hon Sir Charles Mantell (-2007)
 Kenneth Rokison QC (-2007), subsequently an international commercial arbitrator
 Sir Geoffrey Vos (2005–09) a former chairman of the Bar of England and Wales and subsequently a judge of the High Court of England and Wales
 Peter David Smith QC (1996–2010), a barrister practising in Northern Ireland, where he served as a member of the Independent Commission on Policing for Northern Ireland and as the chairman of the Parole Commissioners for Northern Ireland
 Jonathan Sumption QC (1995–2011) was a London-based barrister practising from Brick Court Chambers, specialising in commercial, European Union and public law. In 2011 he became the first practitioner to be appointed directly to the United Kingdom Supreme Court.
 David Vaughan QC (appointed 2000), a London-based practitioner at Brick Court Chambers specialising in European Union law
 Dame Heather Steel DBE (2004–2012), High Court judge, England and Wales (Queen's Bench Division) 1993–2001

Bailiff and Deputy Bailiff of Jersey

Current Bailiff and Deputy Bailiff

Former Bailiffs and Deputy Bailiffs 

The Deputy Bailiff (Appointment and Functions) (Jersey) Law 1958 created the office of Deputy Bailiff to cope with the Bailiff's increasing workload. The list below is of holders of the office of Deputy Bailiff who were not subsequently appointed as Bailiff.
 1962-1968 Francis de Lisle Bois OBE
 1986-1992 Vernon Tomes

Commissioners of the Royal Court 
Under the Royal Court (Jersey) Law 1948, Part II, Commissioners of the Royal Court are appointed by the Bailiff for the hearing of a specified cause or matter or a specified term.

Current Commissioners of the Royal Court

Former Commissioners of the Royal Court
 Sir Richard Tucker (2003-July 2010), a retired High Court judge. He 'was initially appointed for a number of individual cases but in April 2004 was appointed for 12 months', an appointment that was renewed annually until his 80th birthday.
 Sir Geoffrey Nice QC (2006–2009)
 Sir Philip Bailhache (2009-July 2011), a retired Bailiff of Jersey
 Lord Sumption OBE PC QC. Already serving as a judge of the Jersey Court of Appeal, he was appointed as a Commissioner of the Royal Court in December 2010 but stated his intention to relinquish his judicial appointments in Jersey before he took his seat on the UK Supreme Court.

Jurats

The Jurats are lay people who are the judges of fact when the Royal Court sits as the Inferior Number, and also pass sentence in criminal matters heard by the Royal Court. They hold office until the age of 72.

Current Jurats 

The current Jurats are as follows:

Former jurats
This list contains jurats appointed from 1945.
 1945-__ George Philip Billot
 1946-__ William John Jervoise Collas
 1946-__ Neville Godfray Hind
 1946-__ John Le Marquand
 1946-__ Percy Chambers Cabot
 1947-__ Hedley Le Riche Edwards
 1949-__ Reginald Philip Roissier
 1949-__ Sir Daniel Alfred Edmond Cabot, formerly Chief Veterinary Officer of the United Kingdom
 1949-__ Christopher John Molesworthy Riley, Seigneur of Trinity, Lieutenant-Colonel in the Royal Artillery
 1949-__ Guy Malet de Carteret
 1950-__ Gerald Renouf
 1950-__ Cdr Edward Owen Obbard, DSC, GM (RN)
 1951-__ Col Henry Monckton Vatcher, MC
 1953-__ Donald Philip Norman
 1954-65 Clifford Orange, educated at Victoria College, Deputy for St Brelade 1934-37 and Chief Aliens Officer 1937-46
 1954-__ Major Leslie Thomas Anthoine, educated at Victoria College and Bristol University, Connétable of St Saviour 1923-48
 1955-__ Ernest Benest, educated at Victoria College and had a career as a bank manager
 1955-__ Capt Francis Ahier, merchant seaman
 1955-59 Major General Basil Charles Davey, CB CBE, formerly a professional soldier
 1955-__ Brigadier Stuart Douglas Graham, formerly a professional soldier
 1957-__ Francis Renouf Billot
 1958-__ Edward John Syvret
 1959-__ Cecil Ernest Esnouf
 1959-__ Capt Bertram Liott Blampied, educated at Victoria College and Sandhurst, grandson of Jurat T. Blampied and Jurat C.G. Renouf
 1960-__ Francis Le Boutillier
 1962-__ Alfred John Du Feu
 1963-__ William Eugene de Faye, educated at Victoria College, called to the English and Jersey Bars in 1925, worked in banking in England and Jersey, chairman of the Jersey branch of the United Nations Association
 1963-__ John Herbert Pallot
 1964-__ Stuart Philip Pepin
 1964-__ Richard Durnford Lloyd, educated at Victoria College, called to the English and Jersey Bars in 1937, served in the Colonial Legal Service in Nigeria and Malta
 1965-__ Francis Edward Luce, educated at Oxenford House, farmer, served as a Deputy 1954-65
 1966-__ Ralph Edward Bishop Voisin, educated at Victoria College, called to the Jersey Bar in 1925, served as Deputy for St Brelade 1937–45, Magistrate 1957-64
 1966-__ Herbert Brooke
 1966-__ Robert Hyland, MBE, career with Midland Bank
 1967-__ Raymond Frank Le Brocq, educated at Jersey Modern School, director of Jersey Road Transport Ltd and Jersey Motor Transport Co Ltd
 1968-__ William Francis Alfred Hamilton
 1968-__ Roy Ernest Bailhache OBE
 1969-__ Arthur Alfred Henry Downer
 1969-__ Dennis William Ryan, educated at Victoria College and Gonville and Caius College, Cambridge, Connétable of St Helier, director of various companies
 1972-82 Lester Vivian Bailhache MA, educated at Victoria College, Shrewsbury and Merton College, Oxford, called to the English Bar and in 1933 to the Jersey Bar, Lieutenant Bailiff 1980–82, Deputy of St Clement; his sons, Sir Philip Bailhache and William Bailhache, became Bailiffs.
 1974-__ Herbert Henry Le Quesne
 1974-__ Henry Perrée
 1975-__ Raymond Helleur le Cornu
 1975-__ Hon John Coutanche, a brewer and son of a former Bailiff, Lord Coutanche
 1975-__ John Harold Vint, a farmer
 1977-__ Maxwell Gordon Lucas
 1977-86 Leslie Alexander Picot, educated at Jersey Modern School, qualified as an accountant in 1934 becoming a partner in Alex Picot & Co, Methodist local preacher
 1977-__ George Norman Simon
 1980-20__ Peter Gilroy Blampied
 1980-2001 Barbara Myles OBE, a medical practitioner specialising in children's medicine and free-lance journalist, served on the Jersey Juvenile Court Panel 1970–80, first woman jurat
 1982-__ Clarence Sheppard Dupré
 1985-1997 Michael Walter Bonn, Kt. of Sovereign Military Order of Malta; Officer, Welsh Guards; ADC to Brigadier A.G. Bonn, CBE, MC; educated at Eton; director of Willis, Faber & Dumas Ltd 1965-76; director of Morgan Grenfell (Jersey) Ltd 1960-97; Committee of the Societe Jersaise 1985-88; served as Deputy of St Peter 1978-84; Chair of L.B. Bonn Memorial Foundation of the RNID 1996-1997 with Tstee & Hon. Sec: ITPC Commissioner Philip Bonn; and being a 6th generational descendant of the former Lt. Governor of Jersey (1761-1772) Gen. the Rt. Hon. Sir George Keppel, (3rd) Earl of Albemarle, KG, MP, PC; a great grandson of HM King Charles II, who resided in Jersey, in 1646 and 1649, when styled as HRH The Prince of Wales
 1986-__ John James Morel Orchard, educated in the UK and Ireland, had a career in banking after service in the RAF
 1986-__ Geoffrey Hubert Hamon
 1986- Charles Leonard Gruchy, veterinary surgeon, educated at Victoria College and Edinburgh University
 1987-2003 Mazel Joan Le Ruez MBE, educated at the Girls Collegiate School, became Island Commissioner of the Girl Guides, guest house proprietor, served as a panel member of the Juvenile Court
 1989- Alfred (known as Alf) Vibert, farmer, director of a building firm, guest house proprietor involved in the Honorary Police in St Brelade
 1990- Ernest William ("Nick") Herbert, founding chairman of the Council for the Protection of Jersey's Heritage
 1991-2004 Michael Arthur (known as Mike) Rumfitt (Lieutenant Bailiff 2003-04) was educated at Victoria College and had a career in journalism, retiring as editor of the Jersey Evening Post
 1994- Edward James MacGregor Potter, educated at Manchester Grammar School, formerly a law draftsman and Greffier to the States of Jersey
 1995-2011 Philip John de Veulle OBE (1995–2011, Lieutenant Bailiff from 1999), retired chartered accountant, also served as chairman of the Jersey Heritage Trust
 1996-2004 Arthur Philip Quérée, Connétable of St Ouen
 1997-2010 Sally Carolyn Le Brocq OBE, founding member of Victim Support Jersey, daughter of the Bailiff Cecil Harrison
 1997-2012 John Claude Tibbo (Lieutenant Bailiff 2010-12): educated at Victoria College, worked for Midland Bank in Jersey for 37 years until his retirement in 1996, Commissioner of the Jersey Financial Services Commission 1998-2005 and in 2011 was appointed a non-executive director of Jersey Development Company Ltd
 1998-2009 Roy Malcolm Bullen, formerly the Jersey Harbourmaster and chairman of the Jersey Lifeboat Management Group
 1998-2012 John Lyndon Le Breton, former Vice Principal of Victoria College
 1999-2006 Donald Henry Georgelin
 1999-2009 Geoffrey Charles Allo
 2003-11 Lorna Jean (known as Jean) King, MBE,a former nurse and founder of Jersey Hospice Care
 2004-09 Mary Newcombe, formerly Greffier to the States of Jersey
 2004-11 Paul Frith Liddiard, a dental surgeon.

Magistrates and Assistant Magistrates of Jersey

Former Magistrates 
 1950s E.A. Dorey CBE
 1957-1964 Ralph Edward Bishop Voisin: he was elected as a Jurat in 1966
 
 1999-2008 Ian Le Marquand: educated at Victoria College, after private practice he served as Judicial Greffier and Master of the Royal Court. In 2008 he was elected a Senator in the States of Jersey and serves as minister for home affairs in the Council of Ministers.
 ?-2013 Ian Christmas: Mr Christmas has not sat judicially since 2008 when an investigation into allegations of fraud commenced; he was convicted in 2012 but remained in office until he resigned in February 2013.

External links
 An Online Resource for the Royal Court of Jersey
 Jersey Legal Information Board website

References